Marine Hedge may refer to:

 A colony of coral, a marine animal
 Marine Hedge, a 1985 victim of American serial killer Dennis Rader, the BTK Killer